The Philological Society, or London Philological Society, is the oldest learned society in Great Britain dedicated to the study of language as well as a registered charity. The current Society was established in 1842 to "investigate and promote the study and knowledge of the structure, the affinities, and the history of languages". The society publishes a journal, the Transactions of the Philological Society, issued three times a year as well as a monographic series.

The first Philological Society, based in London's Fitzroy Square, was founded in 1792 under the patronage of Thomas Collingwood of St Edmund Hall, Oxford.  Its publication was titled The European Magazine, and London Review.

The Philological Society is a member organisation of the University Council of General and Applied Linguistics.

History

The Society's early history is most marked by a proposal in July 1857 to create an up-to-date dictionary of the English language. This proposal, issued by Richard Chenevix Trench, Herbert Coleridge, and Frederick Furnivall, members of the Unregistered Words Committee, and an article by Trench, entitled On Some Deficiencies in our English Dictionaries, eventually led the Society to formally adopt the idea of creating a comprehensive new dictionary on 7 January 1858.

In 1952, the Society hosted the seventy Congress of the International Congress of Linguists in London.

At a later date, the Society was instrumental in the early stages of the Survey of English Dialects conducted by Harold Orton between 1950 and 1961, helping to develop, amongst other things, a questionnaire for use in gathering data.

Activities
The society holds seven regular meetings each academic year; traditionally, four take place in London at SOAS University of London, the other three in Cambridge, Oxford, and at another university outside of South East England.
Most meetings consist of hour-long academic papers being presented by one or more scholar. Occasionally, round table or panel discussions are organised. Every two years, together with the British Academy the Society organises the Anna Morpurgo Davies Lecture, named in honour of its former president.

Prizes and Bursaries
Once every two years, the Society awards the R. H. Robins Prize for an article on a subject within the Society's area of interest; the prize bears the name of a former president of the Society.
Every year, the Society further awards a limited number of bursaries valued at £5,000 each to students embarking on taught postgraduate programmes in all areas of linguistics or philology.

Governance
The Society is a registered charity and a company limited by guarantee, having been incorporated on 2 January 1879. The Society is governed by its trustees, consisting of the President (appointed at an Annual General Meeting for a period of three years, with the option to renew for
one further year), the Vice-Presidents (appointed for life at an Annual General Meeting; usually former presidents), the other Officers, and up to twenty ordinary members of Council, who are elected annually at an Annual General Meeting.

As of February 2021, the Officers of the Society are:
Secretary: Simon Pulleyn
Treasurer: Peter Austin
Secretary for Publications (Transactions): Lutz Marten
Secretary for Publications (Monographs): Melanie Green
Secretary for Membership: Richard K. Ashdowne
Secretary for Student Associate Members: Joshua Booth

List of presidents

The following list is based on the sporadically occurring statements concerning membership of the Society's Council as printed in the Transactions of the Philological Society of the relevant years.

See also
Oxford English Dictionary
Philology
Linguistics
Transactions of the Philological Society
Survey of English Dialects

References

External links

Official blog of the Philological Society

Learned societies of the United Kingdom
1842 establishments in the United Kingdom
Organizations established in 1842
Linguistic societies
Educational charities based in the United Kingdom